Saniabad may refer to:
 Saniabad, Kerman
 Saniabad, Yazd